Antonia is a historic plantation in Port Allen, Louisiana, USA.

History
The land was granted to Pierre Lebert in 1793. It was inherited by his daughter, who married Zephirin Blanchard. Zephirin Blanchard married Lebert's daughter Elsie and expanded the plantation. The house was built circa 1811. Meanwhile, Zephirin Blanchard served in the War of 1812. His son, Arthur Zephirin, subsequently served in the American Civil War of 1861–1865. The plantation still belonged to his ancestors in 2008.

Architectural significance
The house has been listed on the National Register of Historic Places since August 1, 2008.

References

Houses on the National Register of Historic Places in Louisiana
Houses completed in 1811
West Baton Rouge Parish, Louisiana
National Register of Historic Places in West Baton Rouge Parish, Louisiana